Sino-Uralic or Sino-Finnic is a proposed language family consisting of the Sinitic languages (Chinese) and the Uralic languages. Sino-Uralic is proposed as an alternative to the Sino-Tibetan family and thus is in opposition to the mainstream Sino-Tibetan family held by the majority of linguists. The theory is mainly supported by the Chinese linguist Jingyi Gao, but has been proposed by other linguists, most notably by Karl August Hermann. Gao suggested the proto-population could have been lived in Neolithic China and carried the Haplogroup N, claiming that a common proto-language could have been spoken around 5.000-10.000 years ago. However, connections with the Uralic and other language families are generally seen as speculative.

Theory 
Gao argued that Chinese has three major layers, he saw the root of Chinese as coming from a common Sino-Uralic source, the second layer coming from Indo-European during the Chalcolithic age or later and the third layer coming from Yeniseian during the Bronze Age. Jingyi Gao presented the theory as an alternative to the commonly accepted Sino-Tibetan language family. Gao argued that there are multiple issues with the Sino-Tibetan language family and that similarities between Sinitic and Tibeto-Burman are better explained as being the result of loaning and mutual influence instead of being one language family as most linguists assert.

Gao argued that the monosyllabic structure of Chinese vocabulary was a later development due to external influences, arguing that the word structure of the Sinitic languages in the past was closer to the Uralic languages. Similarly, Karl August Hermann argued that the monosyllabic word structure in Sinitic is not an obstacle to a linguistic relationship.

History 

A relation between Sinitic and Uralic was proposed earlier by the Estonian linguist Karl August Hermann in 1895. Karl August Hermann made a comparison of Estonian, Finnish and Chinese, arguing that they were related. However, the earliest known mention of a possible relationship between the Uralic and Sinitic languages was made by Sajnovics in 1770, who raised questions about a possible relation of Chinese and Hungarian, due to apparent lexical similarities. In the modern day its main advocate has been Jingyi Gao, first proposing it in 2005 and later making another book on the topic in 2008 along with making later articles. Estonian academics and linguists such as Ago Künnap, Jaan Kaplinski, Urmas Sutrop and Märt Läänemets along with a few Chinese professors such as Feng Zheng, Li Baojia and Jiang Jicheng have expressed interest over the theory and calling for more studies on the topic, though being cautious and thus not directly endorsing Gao's theory of a direct relationship between Sinitic and Uralic. George van Driem argues that Sino-Uralic along with other theories such as Sino-Indo-European are constructed by using flawed methodologies with inadequate knowledge of historical Chinese and the Trans-Himalayan languages, representing false language families. According to Van Driem, the theory is not supported by proper evidence.

Before Gao, Morris Swadesh had already theorized about a relation between Sinitic and Uralic, proposing a more radical and massive Dené-Finnish grouping which encompasses Athabaskan, Uralic and the Sino-Tibetan languages. Swadesh's theory has been called "radical". Another similar large language family including Sinitic and Uralic, was suggested by Karl Bouda in 1950, his theory included: Sino-Tibetan, Uralic, Yeniseian, Austronesian and others being distantly related.

Proposed evidence 
Karl August Hermann argued that there are multiple similarities between Sinitic and Uralic, which he used to support his hypothesis on the relation of Sinitic and Uralic. His proposed evidences include:

 The lack of grammatical gender
 Similarities in the use of the genitive
 Common word roots
 Similarities in word structure

Lexical 
Some shared cognates proposed by Jingyi Gao:

Gao also compared Finnish tähti 'star' to Mandarin tai 'extremely' and Minnan thai 'extremely'.

Cognates proposed by Karl August Hermann 
The following cognates were proposed by Karl August Hermann:

Phonological

Sound correspondences proposed by Jingyi Gao 
Finnish and Estonian "k", Minnan "g" and Cantonese "j".

Finnish [ala] and Mandarin [ən], Cantonese [ɐn] and Minan [un]. 

Finnish /k/ and Mandarin /ŋ/.

Finnic -aja and Mandarin -aŋ / Cantonese and Minnan -oŋ 

Uralic /p/, Mandarin / Cantonese /f/ and Minnan /h/

Mandarin -a and Finnish -ota

Finnic /ʋ/, Mandarin /x/, Cantonese /w/ or /f/ and Minnan /h/.

Mandaring -uei, Cantonese -eoi, Finnic -osi North Saami -uohta

Proto-language

See also 
Haplogroup NO
Uralo-Siberian languages
Ural-Altaic languages
Dené–Caucasian languages

References 

Proposed language families